American singer-actress Cher has released numerous music video titles since 1989 on VHS, LaserDisc, VCD and DVD. These listings include the official international videography, some titles and formats were only released in certain countries such as North America or the UK. Cher has also appeared on DVD releases for VH1 Divas live concerts Divas Live '99, Divas 2002.

This list includes a comprehensive listing of official music video releases by Cher. Cher was ranked #17 on VH1's "50 Greatest Women of The Video Era" list.

Music videos

Second versions
Second versions were created for some videos. While some are almost identical, some are completely different.

Remix videos

Video albums

Fitness videos

See also
List of best-selling music artists
List of artists who reached number one on the Hot 100 (U.S.)
List of number-one dance hits (United States)
List of artists who reached number one on the U.S. Dance chart

References

External links
Official Cher website

Videography
Videographies of American artists